GTV (previously known as Global TV) is an Indonesian free-to-air television network. It was launched on 8 October 2002. Originally a music television channel as MTV broadcaster in Indonesia and Asia, GTV shifted its focus to general entertainment programming targeting young adults. Currently the network airs news, soap opera, reality and game shows, along with Nickelodeon animation series and anime making up its programming schedule. It is owned by Media Nusantara Citra (MNC), which also owns RCTI, MNCTV and iNews.

History

Global TV was originally established on 22 March 1999 by joint-venture of formerly government-backed Islamic association ICMI and The International Islamic Forum for Science, Technology and Human Resource (IIFTIHAR) under the name Global IIFTIHAR Broadcasting and company name PT Global Investasi Bermutu. The network was intended for Islamic dawah, as well as education, technology, news, sports and human development programming - it would become the first Islamic-oriented of its kind in Indonesia (the first Islamic-oriented television station later hold by Bandung-based local station MQTV in 2006). Global TV obtained a broadcast license on 25 October 1999 on Habibie administration.

Bimantara Citra acquired Global TV ownership with its subsidiary PT Panca Andika Mandiri (then renamed to MNC Media) as new owner in 2001 and changed the company's name to PT Global Informasi Bermutu and thus replacing SCTV as RCTI's new sister network. Global TV began trial broadcast on 8 October 2001 in Jakarta.

During trial broadcast, Global TV aired many foreign music video with Dewi Rezer, the music video shown on Global TV during trial broadcast such as Kylie Minogue "In Your Eyes", Creed "My Sacrifice", OutKast "Ms. Jackson" and Brandy "What About Us?".

On 7 March 2002, Global TV and MTV Asia began partnership to broadcasting MTV Indonesia, after previously aired on ANteve was stopped due to financial crisis.

MTV officially started on Global TV from 1 April 2002 with programs such as MTV Land, MTV Most Wanted, MTV Alternative Nation, MTV WOW, MTV Classic, MTV Asia Hitlist and MTV Ampuh, during that, Global TV use  TVG name on their logo with grey color (later blue and green color added on 1 June 2002).

Global TV expanded broadcasts into 5 cities (Bandung, Yogyakarta, Surabaya, Medan and Palembang)
in August 2002 with 15 hours transmission programs from 09:00 to 24:00 WIB, on 1 October 2002, the block was expanded into 17 hours transmission programs from 07:00 to 24:00 WIB.

On 8 October 2002, Global TV officially launched as music television channel for a teenagers in Indonesia and Asia as a MTV broadcaster with commenced 24-hours around the clock transmission broadcasts with music and programs from Indonesia, Asia and its sister network in United States, it also become the world first free-to-air television channel to aired MTV for 24-hours non stop.

After three years as a music television channel, on 15 January 2005, Global TV shifted to general entertainment programming and began producing its own television programs for its 12-hour broadcast, This because Global TV and MTV reach agreement on 15 October 2004 to reduced MTV program to 12-hours with MNC Media owner Hary Tanoesoedibjo.

On the same day, it expanded its coverage area to 18 cities in Indonesia and introduce new slogan "Seru!", the slogan itself also appear on the Global TV logo during on-air.

On the same year, Global TV became  broadcaster of Formula 1 and A1.

On 1 February 2006, Global TV and MTV Networks began partnership to broadcast program Nickelodeon for kids in Global TV with programs such as SpongeBob SquarePants, Blue's Clues and Dora the Explorer. it also introduce logo Nick di Global TV.

On the same year, Global TV became  broadcaster of Serie A.

On 1 January 2007, Global TV started produced MTV Indonesia programs with MNC Media and MTV program in Global TV now broadcast live, such as MTV Global Room, MTV Ampuh, MTV Total Request and MTV Insomnia.

Global TV became broadcaster of UEFA Euro 2008 alongside with RCTI and TPI.

On 2009, Global TV became broadcaster of 2009 FIFA Confederations Cup and 2010 FIFA World Cup alongside with RCTI.

On 2010, Global TV became broadcaster of Premier League from 2010 to 2013 with MNCTV.

On 2011, MTV program on Global TV only aired in the midnight, started from 01:00 to 04:00 WIB.

On 1 January 2012, Global TV stopped aired MTV program after 10 years. but still aired MTV EXIT on 1 September 2012.

On 11 October 2017, Global TV was rename as GTV and introduce new logo for its 15th anniversary (Amazing 15), the name GTV already use as Global TV initial.

Since November 2017 after the re-branding, GTV not aired any sporting events until 2019.

GTV began broadcasting the E-Sport tournaments/contests (including talent searching show)/events in 2019.

On 2023, for the first time since 2012, GTV started new program named GTV Love Music which aired music video like during Global TV/MTV.

Presenters

Current
 Aldi Hawari (also a presenter at iNews and MNC News)
 Fanni Imaniar (former tvOne and CNN Indonesia anchor, also a presenter at iNews and MNC News)
 Fazilah Khairunnisa (also a presenter at iNews)
 Herjuno Syaputra
 Irma Meida
 Kezia Tuju
 Pramesywara Adisendjaya (also a presenter at iNews)
 Prisa Sombo Datu
 Prisca Papilaya
 Renie Arumsari
 Shabrina Hasilah

Former
 Wahyu Wiwoho
 Panji Himawan
 Dewi Kumala (now at RTV)
 Miea Kusuma
 Risca Indah (still working at MNC Media but moving to MNC News)
 Vannessa Aesculapiana
 Virgianty Kusumah
 Vina Mubtadi (now at VOA Indonesia)
 Lusiana Putri
 Andini Effendi
 Isabella Fawzi
 Rena Oktoria
 Shinta Indra Maya Sari
 Zacky Hussein (now at RTV)
 Lorraine Evelyn (now at DAAI TV)
 Cynthia Rompas (now at Kompas TV)
 Amelia Yachya (now at tvOne)
 Rias Audis
 Riri Rizzi
 Tito Laksmana
 Adjat Wiratma (still working at MNC Media but moving to MNC News)
 Togi Sinaga (still working at MNC Media but moving to MNC News)
 Restu Aditomo
 Gati Kamka
 Lani Regina
 Shema Bahrak
 Marlyn Silaen (now an editor)
 Agung Hardiansyah (now at BTV)

Slogans
As Global TV
2002-2005: Nongkrong Terus di MTV (Keep Hanging Out on MTV) (along with MTV Indonesia)
2002-2005: MTV Gue Banget (MTV Very Mine) (along with MTV Indonesia)
2005-2006: Millions of Entertainment (sub-slogan)
2005-2008, 2011-2017: Global TV Seru! (Global TV is Exciting!)
2008-2011: Untuk Keluarga Indonesia (For Indonesian Families)
2011-2013: 100% Seru! (100% Exciting!)

As GTV
2017–present: Pilihan Terbaik Keluarga Indonesia (Indonesian Families' Best Choice)

See also 

 MTV Indonesia
 RCTI
 MNCTV
 iNews
 List of television stations in Indonesia

References

External links
Official website

Television networks in Indonesia
Television channels and stations established in 2002
Music video television
Music television channels
Mass media in Jakarta
2002 establishments in Indonesia
Media Nusantara Citra